The 2007 Belgian Cup Final, took place on 26 May 2007 between Club Brugge and Standard Liège. It was the 52nd Belgian Cup final and was won by Club Brugge due to a goal by Manasseh Ishiaku.

Route to the final

Match

Details

External links
  

Belgian Cup finals
Cup Final
Belgian Cup final 2007
Belgian Cup final 2007